Daniel Franco may refer to:

 Daniel Franco (designer) (born 1971), American fashion designer
 Daniel Franco (Brazilian footballer) (born 1971), Brazilian football manager and former left-back
 Daniel Franco (Argentine footballer) (born 1991), Argentine football centre-back

See also
 Daniele Franco (born 1953), Italian economist and civil servant
 Daniel Frank (disambiguation)